The orienteering events at the 2005 World Games in Duisburg was played between 18 and 19 August. 78 orienteers, from 18 nations, participated in the tournament. The orienteering competition took place at Jahnstadion in Bottrop.

Participating nations

Medal table

Events

References

External links
 International Orienteering Federation
 Orienteering on IWGA website
 Results

 
2005 World Games